CFWC-FM (93.9 MHz, Hot Country 93.9) is a radio station in Brantford, Ontario. Owned by Evanov Communications, the station broadcasts a country format. The studios are located at 571 West St in Brantford while its transmitter is located atop a church steeple at Dundas St and Sydenham St in Brantford.

History
On October 11, 2001, Anthony Schleifer, on behalf of a company to be incorporated, received approval from the Canadian Radio-television and Telecommunications Commission to operate an English-language specialty FM radio programming undertaking at Brantford. The station's original frequency was 99.5 FM and was branded as Freshwind 99.5 when it began broadcasting in early 2002. Its transmitter located atop a church steeple, with its studios and offices at 271 Greenwich Street in Brantford. The station has also been given permission to increase power to 250 watts, but was not carried out at the time it was granted.

On May 20, 2004, CFWC-FM was given CRTC approval to change frequency to 93.9 MHz and to increase effective radiated power from 50 to 250 watts. Antenna height remained 23.9 metres EHAAT. When CFWC moved to 93.9 MHz, it adopted the name Power 93.9.

In 2010, Durham Radio filed an application to acquire CFWC, pursuant to the approval of a separate application to remove license conditions requiring it to operate as a Christian station, and thus allowing it to switch to a mainstream commercial format. On February 10, 2011, the CRTC denied the application, noting that it appeared to be an attempt to undermine the normal competitive licensing process.

On February 17, 2012, an application was filed with the CRTC under which the station would be sold to Sound of Faith Broadcasting Inc. The deal was subsequently approved by the CRTC on June 28, 2012, with Sound of Faith Broadcasting officially taking ownership on August 24, 2012. The station was subsequently renamed FaithFM.

On July 20, 2017, the CRTC approved the sale of the station to Evanov Radio Group. The sale was completed August 31, 2017.

In February 2020, the CRTC approved a request by Evanov to swap CFWC and CKPC's licensed formats. Evanov planned to move CKPC's country format to FM on CFWC, with the station's existing Christian format moving to AM on CKPC; Evanov felt that the country music format would be more profitable and have a larger audience on an FM signal, improving their ability to compete with out-of-market stations. The company stated that both stations had been unprofitable for several years. The CRTC also approved a power increase for the station, increasing its effective radiated power from 250 watts to 1,700 as a Class A signal.

The switch took effect on-air on September 4, 2020, with CFWC flipping to country as Hot Country 93.9, and the previous Arise Brantford programming moving to AM 1380. In comparison to the previous AM country format, "Hot Country" has a larger focus on current artists.

References

External links
 
 
 

Fwc
Fwc
Fwc
Radio stations established in 2001
2001 establishments in Ontario